The Guang Ming temple in Orlando, Florida, United States is the largest Buddhist temple in Central Florida. The three story, traditional Chinese-monastic style temple was completed in 2007 and cost approximately $5 million to construct.  The temple is associated with Fo Guang Shan, a monastic organization from Taiwan led by Venerable Hsing Yun that claims over one million members worldwide, and with Hsi Lai Temple in Los Angeles.  Guang Ming is home to several resident monastics, and boasts a vast main shrine room, auxiliary meditation room, vegetarian cafeteria, tea room, gift shop, and guest dormitories.  The temple is open daily from 10:30 am to 5:00 pm, and weekly events are held in Chinese as well as English.

References 
 Persaud, Babita . "Guang Ming Temple will Be the Largest One in Central Florida", The Orlando Sentinel, December 5, 2006. Accessed October 2, 2007.

External links
 Florida Guang Ming Temple location

Buddhist temples in Florida
Buildings and structures in Orlando, Florida
Asian-American culture in Florida
Chinese-American culture
Fo Guang Shan temples
Taiwanese-American culture
2007 establishments in Florida
Overseas Chinese organisations